Nippononebria sawadai is a species of ground beetle in the Nebriinae subfamily that is endemic to Japan.

References

Beetles described in 1979
Beetles of Asia
Endemic fauna of Japan